Hugo P. Hamilton (born Johannes Ó hUrmoltaigh, 28 January 1953) is an Irish writer. Hamilton was born and raised in Dublin with an Irish father and a German mother. Hamilton has written plays, short stories, novels and memoirs.

Life
Hamilton's mother was a German Roman Catholic who travelled to Ireland in 1949 on a pilgrimage, married an Irishman, and settled in the country. His father was a strict nationalist who insisted that his children should speak only German or Irish, but not English, a prohibition the young Hugo resisted inwardly. "The prohibition against English made me see that language as a challenge. Even as a child I spoke to the walls in English and secretly rehearsed dialogue I heard outside," he wrote later. As a consequence of this, he grew up with three languages – English, Irish and German – and a sense of never really belonging to any: "There were no other children like me, no ethnic groups that I could attach myself to".

Hamilton became a journalist, and then a writer of short stories and novels. His first three novels were set in Central Europe. Following a year spent in Berlin on a DAAD cultural scholarship, he completed his memoir of childhood, The Speckled People (2003), which went on to achieve widespread international acclaim. Telling the story through the eyes of his childhood self, it evoked the struggle to make sense of a bizarre 'language war' in which the child perceives going out onto the English speaking street outside as a daily migration. It "triumphantly avoids ... sentimental nostalgia and victim claims"，wrote Hermione Lee in The Guardian "The cumulative effect is to elevate an act of scrupulous remembering into a work of art," commented James Lasdun in The New York Times. The story is picked up in the 2006 volume, The Sailor in the Wardrobe.

In May 2007, German publisher Luchterhand published Die redselige Insel (The Island of Talking), in which Hamilton retraced the journey Heinrich Böll made in Ireland that was to be the basis of his best-selling book Irisches Tagebuch (Irish Journal) in 1957. His fellow Irish writer Anne Enright has described Hamilton a writer who "loves the spaces between things: his characters live, not just between cultures or between languages, but between the past and the future." Hamilton's 2014 novel, Every Single Minute is a fictional account of a journey to Berlin which the author undertook with his fellow writer and memoirist, Nuala O Faolain, who was dying of cancer.

Hugo Hamilton lives in Dublin. In 1992 he was awarded the Rooney Prize for Irish Literature. Sang impur, the French translation of The Speckled People, won the Prix Femina étranger in 2004 and Il cane che abbaiava alle onde, the Italian translation of the memoir, won the Premio Giuseppe Berto in 2004. He adapted his memoir The Speckled People for the stage at the Gate Theatre in Dublin in 2011. A new play entitled The Mariner, based on the story of his grandfather returning from the First World War, ran at the Gate Theatre in 2014. Hamilton is a member of Aosdána and has been awarded the Bundesverdienstkreuz (Order of Merit of the Federal Republic of Germany) for his unique contribution to literature and understanding between Germany and Ireland.

Bibliography

Novels
Surrogate City (1990) 
The Last Shot (1991) 
The Love Test (1995) 
Headbanger (1996) 
Sad Bastard (1998) 
Disguise (2008) 
Hand in the Fire (2010) 
Every Single Minute (2014) 
Dublin Palms (2019) 
The Pages (2022)

Short stories
Dublin Where the Palm Trees Grow (1996)

Memoirs
The Speckled People (2003) 
The Sailor in the Wardrobe (2006)  [US Title: The Harbor Boys ]

Drama
 The Speckled People (Methuen plays) Gate Theatre 2011
 The Mariner (original stageplay)  Gate Theatre 2014 
 Text from the novel 'Surrogate City' performed by David Moss in the opera by Heiner Goebbles entitled 'Surrogate Cities'(1994).

Foreign-language versions
 Every Single Minute: Jede Einzelne Minute (Luchterhand 2014), Un Voyage à Paris (France, 2015)
 Hand in the Fire: Der irische Freund, (Luchterhand, München, Germany 2011)
The Speckled People: Gescheckte Menschen (Germany, 2004); Sang impur (France, 2004); Il cane che abbaiava alle onde (Italy, 2004); El perro que ladraba a las olas (Spain, 2005); Sproetenkoppen (Netherlands, 2006); Gent mestissa (Andorra, 2007); Белязаните (Bulgaria, 2008), Люди з веснянками (Ukraine, 2012), Qeni që iu lehte valëve (Albania, 2012), Ar re vrizhellet (Brittany, 2020).
Headbanger: Der letzte Held von Dublin (Germany, 1999); Déjanté (France, 2006); Lo scoppiato (Italy, 2000)
The Sailor in the Wardrobe: Der Matrose im Schrank (Germany, 2006); Le marin de Dublin (France, 2006); De verdwijntruc (Netherlands, 2006); Il marinaio nell'armadio (Italy, 2007)
Sad Bastard: Ein schlechter Verlierer (Germany, 2001)
The Last Shot: Kriegsliebe (Germany, 1996); L'ultimo sparo (Italy, 2006); Het laatste schot (Netherlands, 2004)
Surrogate City: Berlin sous la Baltique (France, 1992)

Further reading
 Official Homepage of Hugo Hamilton
 The Speckled People – a conversation with Hugo Hamilton
 "Speaking to the walls in English", by Hugo Hamilton, Powells.com, undated.
 Review of The Speckled People by Hermione Lee in The Guardian, 2003
 Review of The Speckled People by James Lasdun, New York Times 2003
"Hugo Hamilton," Close to the Next Moment: Interviews from a Changing Ireland by Jody Allen Randolph. Manchester: Carcanet, 2010.

References

1953 births
Aosdána members
Irish male novelists
Irish people of German descent
Living people
Writers from Dublin (city)
Prix Femina Étranger winners
Recipients of the Cross of the Order of Merit of the Federal Republic of Germany